The Holden Efijy is an Australian concept car made by Holden and inspired by the Australian-built 1953 Holden FJ. It debuted in 2005 at the Australian International Motor Show.

Design 
The design of the Efijy pays tribute to the 1953 Holden FJ, the second Holden model,  The concept was designed and built entirely in house at GM Holden's Australian design studio and engineering department. The project was overseen by Holden chief designer Richard Ferlazzo. It is painted in a “Soprano Purple” paint colour and features bright work handmade from billet aluminium.

Specifications
The Efijy is based on a lengthened Chevrolet Corvette floor pan and features a 6.0 litre LS2 V8 engine with a Roots supercharger producing  at 6,400 rpm and 560 lb-ft of torque at 4,200 rpm. Power goes to the rear wheels through a rear-mounted 4-speed 4L60E automatic transmission with a limited-slip differential. The exhaust is a fully custom, stainless steel unit and features billet aluminium exhaust tips. It rides on an air suspension system that lowers the car when it is stopped, and also has electronic instrumentation, including a multi-use display screen that disappears into the dash.

Since its debut showing at The Australian International Motor Show in 2005, the Holden Efijy has been named the United States concept car of the year for 2007. Once it returned to Australia, the Efijy visited the National Motor Museum at Birdwood, South Australia, in February 2008 and again from December 2020 as part of the Holden Heroes exhibition along with 12 other significant Holden production and concept vehicles.

In popular culture
The car was featured in Test Drive Unlimited as DLC
The car is featured in Top Gear Australia & Beyond Tomorrow.
The Boyd Fireflame 544 in Just Cause 2 is based on the Holden Efijy.

Gallery

References

Efijy
Retro-style automobiles